65th meridian may refer to:

65th meridian east, a line of longitude east of the Greenwich Meridian
65th meridian west, a line of longitude west of the Greenwich Meridian